Saint Barth First! is a political party in Saint Barthélemy, led by Bruno Magras. It won in the 18 March 2012 Territorial Council elections 16 out of 19 seats. The party is affiliated with the French Les Republicains.

Political parties in Saint Barthélemy
The Republicans (France)